The 2018–19 Liga Nacional de Básquet season is the 35th season of the top professional basketball league in Argentina. The season started on 22 September 2017 with the Torneo Súper 20, which finished on 22 December 2018. The regular season began on 5 December 2018 and finished on 12 May 2019. Following the last season, the competition continues with all 20 teams being placed in a single group, playing a double round-robin, where the best 16 teams at the end of the season qualify for the championship playoffs, while the two teams with the worst record play in a best-of-five relegation series. Before the start of the regular season, the Torneo Súper 20 took place, which awarded two berths to the 2019 Liga Sudamericana de Básquetbol. Quilmes was relegated after losing the playoff series against Atenas.

Relegation and promotion
La Liga Argentina de Básquet Champions Libertad covered the berth left by Salta Basket, who lost the relegation playoffs against Ferro Carril Oeste.

Clubs

Torneo Súper 20
The second edition of the pre-season tournament Torneo Súper 20 took place between 22 September and 22 december 2018. Four groups of five teams each were formed, and played a double round-robin. The top three teams from each group advanced to the playoff stage directly, while the fourth and fifth teams of each group were paired in four best-of-three series to grant the four remaining berths for the playoff stage. The playoff stage consisted of best-of-three series up to the semifinals, where a final four, single-elimination match format was used.

First stage

Group A

Group B

Group C

Group D

Playoffs

Regular season

League table

Playoffs
Playoffs began on 15 May. The relegation series between Atenas and Quilmes began on 18 May.

Championship playoffs

Finals

|}

Relegation playoffs

Clubs in international competitions

Awards
The regular season awards were presented on 13 May.

Yearly Awards
Most Valuable Player: Marcos Mata, San Lorenzo
Best Argentine Player: Marcos Mata, San Lorenzo
Best Foreign Player:  Dar Tucker, San Lorenzo
Sixth Man of the Year: Luciano González, Instituto
Rookie of the Year: Víctor Fernández, Quilmes
Most Improved Player: Agustín Caffaro, Libertad
Coach of the Year: Gonzalo García, San Lorenzo
All-Tournament Team:
 C Eloy Vargas, Gimnasia y Esgrima (CR)
 PF Jasiel Rivero, Boca Juniors
 SF Marcos Mata, San Lorenzo
 SG Dar Tucker, San Lorenzo
 PG Pedro Barral, Obras Sanitarias

References

External links
 Sitio Oficial LNB   

Liga Nacional de Básquet seasons
   
Argentina